Cuthbert is a city in, and the county seat of, Randolph County, Georgia, United States.  The population was 3,520 in 2019.

History
Cuthbert was founded by European Americans in 1831 as seat of the newly formed Randolph County, after Indian Removal of the historic tribes to Indian Territory west of the Mississippi River. John Alfred Cuthbert, who represented Georgia in the U.S. House of Representatives from 1819 to 1821, is its namesake. The county was developed for cotton plantations, the major commodity crop, and the rural area had a high proportion of enslaved African-American workers. Cuthbert was incorporated as a town in 1834 and as a city in 1859, serving as the trading center for the area. The Central of Georgia Railway arrived in Cuthbert in the 1850s, stimulating trade and growth, and providing a means of getting cotton and other crops to market.

A few years before 2022, the city's hospital closed.

Geography
Cuthbert is located at 31º46'15" North, 84º47'37" West (31.770726, -84.793517). The city is located along U.S. Route 27 and U.S. Route 82. U.S. Route 27 passes east of the city leading north  to Columbus and south  to Tallahassee, Florida. U.S. Route 82 passes through the heart of the city leading east  to Albany and west  to Eufaula, Alabama. Other highways that pass through the city include Georgia State Route 266 and Georgia State Route 216.

Climate

Demographics

2020 census

As of the 2020 United States census, there were 3,143 people, 1,194 households, and 839 families residing in the city.

2000 census
As of the census of 2000, there were 3,731 people, 1,360 households, and 870 families residing in the city. The racial makeup of the city was 74.22% African American, 23.69% White, 0.32% Native American, 0.32% Asian, 0.11% Pacific Islander, 0.88% from other races, and 0.46% from two or more races. 1.96% of the population were Hispanic or Latino of any race.

There were 1,360 households, out of which 29.8% had children under the age of 18 living with them, 30.7% were married couples living together, 29.4% had a female householder with no husband present, and 36.0% were non-families. 33.8% of all households were made up of individuals, and 16.5% had someone living alone who was 65 years of age or older. The average household size was 2.52 and the average family size was 3.24.

In the city, the population was spread out, with 26.7% under the age of 18, 14.8% from 18 to 24, 23.2% from 25 to 44, 19.2% from 45 to 64, and 16.1% who were 65 years of age or older. The median age was 34 years. For every 100 females, there were 80.2 males. For every 100 females age 18 and over, there were 71.6 males.

The median income for a household in the city was $16,400, and the median income for a family was $25,000. Males had a median income of $26,696 versus $16,976 for females. The per capita income for the city was $10,166. 33.5% of the population and 29.2% of families were below the poverty line, including 39.8% of those under the age of 18 and 38.5% of those 65 and older.

Culture and historic district
Cuthbert is home to Andrew College (formerly Andrew Female College), a two-year private liberal arts college. The Fletcher Henderson Museum is being established in Cuthbert in honor of the 20th-century jazz musician and orchestra arranger.

The city has notable sites such as a Confederate Army cemetery, historical houses built in the 1800s, and the Fletcher Henderson home. In 2007 an announcement was made of a museum to be dedicated to late resident Lena Baker and issues of racial justice. Baker was an African-American maid who was convicted of capital murder in 1945 in the death of a white man; she was the only woman in Georgia to be executed by electric chair. She had claimed self-defense, and in 2005 the state posthumously pardoned her. She was the subject of a 2001 biography and a 2008 feature film of the same name, The Lena Baker Story. (It was later retitled Hope and Redemption: The Lena Baker Story.)

Education
The Randolph County School District holds grades pre-school to grade twelve, and consists of two elementary, middle, and high schools. The district has 88 full-time teachers and more than 1,530 students.
Randolph County Elementary School
Randolph Clay High School
Albany Technical College

Higher education
Andrew College - Main Campus
Albany Technical College - Cuthbert campus

Notable people
 Lena Baker, the only woman executed in the electric chair in Georgia; she was later pardoned by the state
 Jerry Braswell Jr., former European professional basketball player and Wake Forest Demon Deacon
 Thomas Davis, NFL player, former UGA football player
 Harris DeVane, former stock car racing driver
 Roosevelt Grier, former NFL player
 Franklin A. Hart, four-star general in the United States Marine Corps
 Donnell Harvey, former NBA player, former University of Florida player
 Fletcher Henderson, influential jazz musician and bandleader 
 Larry Holmes, former world heavyweight boxing champion
 Joe, R&B singer and record producer
 Dock J. Jordan, American lawyer, author, educator, civil rights activist; President of Edward Waters University and Kittrell College
 Winfred Rembert, leather-craft artist famous for surviving a lynching in Cuthbert
 George Tyler Wood, second governor of Texas
 Richard R. Wright Jr., sociologist and president of Wilberforce University.

Gallery

References

External links
 South Georgia Historic Newspapers Archive, Digital Library of Georgia
The Southern Tribune, office in Cuthbert, GA, local newspaper serving the southwest Georgia counties of Calhoun, Clay, Randolph, and Quitman

Cities in Georgia (U.S. state)
Cities in Randolph County, Georgia